Vaidya, or vaid is a Sanskrit word meaning "traditional practitioner of Ayurveda", an indigenous Indian system of alternative medicine. Senior practitioners or teachers were called Vaidyarāja ("physician-king") as a mark of respect. Some practitioners who had complete knowledge of the texts and were excellent at their practices were known as Pranaacharya. Some royal families in India had a personal vaidya in attendance and these people were referred to as Rāja Vaidya ("the king's physician").
In Maharashtra, like many other last names, the last name "Vaidya" is linked to the profession that the family followed.

Vaidya as a surname
As a last name in Maharashtra, Karnataka and Kerala, Vaidya is usually found in several communities like the Chandraseniya Kayastha Prabhu, Billava as well as Sonar (goldsmith).

Notables
Lakshman Jagannath Vaidya
Narayan Jagannath Vaidya
Chintaman Vinayak Vaidya
Bhai Vaidya
Arun Shridhar Vaidya
Jalabala Vaidya
Omi Vaidya
Kaajal Oza Vaidya
Rahul Vaidya
Prahalad Chunnilal Vaidya

See also
 Vaid (surname)

References

Surnames
Indian surnames
Linguistic history of India
Indian words and phrases
Traditional healthcare occupations
Titles in India
Men's social titles
Cultural history of India
Ayurveda